The Curious George Brigade (CGB) is an anarchist collective associated with post-left anarchy and affiliated with CrimethInc., who published their 2003 book Anarchy in the Age of Dinosaurs.

A CGB member, Elliott "Smokey" Madison, was arrested on September 24, 2009 in Pittsburgh, and had his Jackson Heights, Queens home (the anarchist collective known as Tortuga House) raided by the Federal Bureau of Investigation and the Joint Terrorism Task Force on October 1, 2009.

Writings
 Anarchy in the Age of Dinosaurs (2003)
A Swarm of Butterflies: A Fierce Defense of Chaos in Direct Action (2002)
 The End Of Arrogance: Decentralization and Anarchist Organizing (2002)
 The Inefficient Utopia, or How Consensus Will Change the World (2003)
 Liberate Not Exterminate (2005)
 Insurrectionary Mutual Aid (retrieved February 28, 2014)

References

CrimethInc.
Anarchist organizations in the United States
Post-left anarchism